Shane Wilkin (born June 9, 1972) is an American politician serving as a member of the Ohio State Senate. He previously served as a member of the Ohio House of Representatives, representing the 91st district from 2018 to 2023.  A Republican, Wilkin's house district included all of Clinton, Highland and Pike counties and portions of Ross county. Prior to serving in the state House, Wilkin served three terms as a Highland County Commissioner. Professionally, he works as a realtor.

In 2018, Wilkin entered the primary to succeed Speaker of the Ohio House of Representatives Cliff Rosenberger, but unexpectedly was appointed to Rosenberger's seat after the Speaker resigned following a campaign finance scandal. Wilkin was appointed after winning the Republican primary for the seat, defeating Rosenberger's preferred candidate, Beth Ann Ellis. He easily won the general election.

References

Links 

 Representative Shane Wilkin (official site)

Living people
Republican Party members of the Ohio House of Representatives
21st-century American politicians
1972 births
County commissioners in Ohio